Leszek Wrona is a retired Polish association football defender who played professionally in Poland, Germany and the United States.  After his retirement, he remained in the United States where he coached in the USISL and USL PDL.

Biography
In 1972, the seventeen-year-old Wrona debuted for Garbarnia Kraków. In 1976, he moved to Legia Warsaw where he spent most of two seasons with the club’s reserve team.  He played one league cup game against Stal Mielec on June 8, 1976. In 1979, he moved to second division Hutnik Kraków where he tied for the league scoring lead that season.  In 1980, he signed with Ruch Chorzów.

In 1984, Wrona moved to Germany where he joined TuS Schloß Neuhaus. In 1985, the team merged with TuS Paderborn-Neuhaus to form SC Paderborn 07. Wrona remained with the renamed team for two more seasons before briefly spending time with the New Jersey Eagles during the 1988 American Soccer League season. He then returned to Ruch Chorzów where he was part of the club's 1989 Polish championship. He left the team after the championship and moved to the United States.

He played for Garfield Vistula. In 1990, Wrona became a player-coach with Gremio Lusitano, taking the team to the 1991 LASA league championship. In 1992, he moved to the Polonia Falcons where he took them to the 1992 CSSA Cup Championship. In 1993, the expansion Connecticut Wolves of the USISL hired Wrona as the team’s first head coach. He both coached and played for the Wolves until resigning in June 1995.  During that time, he also played and coached for Bridgeport Vasco da Gama.

After leaving Wolves, Wrona spent the rest of the 1995 season playing for the Albany Alleycats. That year, he also became the head coach of the Plainville High School boys’ team, a position he held until 1999. In 2000, he became the head coach of the Plainville girls’ team.  In 1996, Wrona briefly coached the Albany Alleycatsteam, then became the head coach for the 1997 season.  In 1997, Gremio Lusitano founded the Western Mass Pioneers to compete in the USISL D-3 Pro League. In October 1997, the team named Wrona as head coach.  Wrona took the Pioneers to the 1998 league championship. He left the team in 2000, returned in 2004, left the team in 2006 and returned in 2008. He left the team for the third time in June 2010.

Wrona now runs a youth soccer academy out of an indoor soccer facility in Bristol. Leszek Wrona's Soccer Academy aims to give young players coaching, aiming to improve their ball skills as well as their "soccer IQ".

External links
 
 Historia Legii Warszawa: Leszek Wrona
 Leszek Wrona's Soccer Academy

References

Living people
1955 births
Albany Alleycats players
Connecticut Wolves players
Garfield Vistula players
Gremio Lusitano players
Hutnik Nowa Huta players
Legia Warsaw players
SC Paderborn 07 players
Polish footballers
Polish expatriate footballers
Polish football managers
Ruch Chorzów players
USISL coaches
USISL players
USL Second Division players
Footballers from Kraków
Association football defenders
Association football midfielders